The Federal Government Academy, also known as Suleja Academy, founded in 1986 by the Federal Government under the Babangida regime, is a Nigerian secondary school in Suleja.

Notable alumni
 Bunmi Banjo, business leader and marketing and strategy professional

External links 
 Federal Government Academy Alumni
 Federal Academy Suleja Website Current
 Federal Academy Suleja Website Old

Secondary schools in Nigeria
Education in Niger State
Educational institutions established in 1986
1986 establishments in Nigeria
Government schools in Nigeria